Melbourne Tierney (3 December 1923 – 27 November 2014) was a Welsh professional rugby league footballer who played in the 1940s and 1950s. Starting with his home village club Tumble RFC after the second world war, Tierney turned professional after the 1946 West Wales Cup final against Amman United RFC at Stradey Park, Llanelli.

Playing career

International honours
Tierney won a cap for Wales while at Belle Vue Rangers in 1953.

County Cup Final appearances
He played left-, i.e. number 3, in Belle Vue Rangers' 7-10 defeat by Wigan in the 1947 Lancashire County Cup Final during the 1947–48 season at Wilderspool Stadium, Warrington on Saturday 1 November 1947.

Club records
Tierney holds Belle Vue Rangers' most consecutive appearances record, with 137-appearances from Saturday 23 September 1950 to Saturday 5 December 1953.

Personal life and death
Tierney was born in Tumble, Carmarthenshire, Wales on 3 December 1923. He married Eiry Bowen in 1947, in Llanelli district. They had two children; Eiriona (born 1949 in Carmarthen), and Linda (born 1953 in Manchester). Tierney later worked as an engineer. He was predeceased by his wife, and died from dementia in Stockport, Greater Manchester on 27 November 2014, at the age of 90.

References

External links
 (archived by archive.is) Picture of Mel Tierney
 (archived by archive.is) Mel Tierney
 (archived by archive.ph) Picture of Mel Tierney
 (archived by archive.ph) Mel Tierney
 (archived by archive.today) Picture of Mel Tierney
 (archived by archive.today) Mel Tierney

1923 births
2014 deaths
Broughton Rangers players
Rochdale Hornets players
Rugby league players from Carmarthenshire
Rugby league second-rows
Rugby union players from Tumble
Wales national rugby league team players
Welsh rugby league players
Welsh rugby union players